Under tha Influence is the sixth album by rapper/producer DJ Quik. It was released on June 4, 2002 on Ark 21 and was his first album to be released on an independent record label. The album included the singles "Trouble" featuring AMG, and Put It on Me featuring Dr. Dre. The album debuted at twenty seven on the U.S. Billboard 200 chart, with 41,000 sold in its first-week.

Reception

Critical response 

AllMusic - 4 Out Of 5 - "DJ Quik still sounds a bit ordinary as a rapper, but his production work here is nothing short of amazing and amazingly varied. The result is his best work in years -- perhaps even his most accomplished work to date."
RapReviews - 9 Out Of 10 - "By turns humerous,  clever, hardcore and smooth, the ubiquitous Quik never runs out of ammunition in his glock, his beats OR his raps."
Vibe - 3 Out Of 5 - "A case study in high-energy rap. Undeniable street cred and gritty production values combine to make UNDER THA INFLUENCE yet another successful stage in this veteran performer's career."

Track listing 

Sample credits
"50 Ways" contains samples of "50 Ways to Leave Your Lover" by Paul Simon.

Charts

References

2002 albums
DJ Quik albums
Albums produced by DJ Quik
Albums produced by Dr. Dre